Eunício Lopes de Oliveira (born 30 September 1952) is a Brazilian politician and businessman. He has represented Ceará in the Federal Senate since 2011 and became president of the Senate of Brazil on 1 February 2017. Previously, he was a federal congressman representing Ceará from 1999 to 2011. He is a member of the Brazilian Democratic Movement Party.  He was candidate running for Governor of Ceará in 2014. He is mentioned in 2017 among the beneficiaries of bribes from the multinational JBS.

References

|-

Living people
1952 births
Presidents of the Federal Senate (Brazil)
Members of the Federal Senate (Brazil)
Brazilian Democratic Movement politicians
People from Ceará
Brazilian businesspeople